Emmelichthys nitidus is a species of rover native to the Indian and Pacific oceans at depths of between .  There are currently two subspecies known:
 Emmelichthys nitidus cyanescens (Guichenot, 1848) native to deep waters of the eastern Pacific Ocean off the coast of Chile and the Juan Fernandez islands.  This subspecies can reach a length of  SL.
 Emmelichthys nitidus nitidus J. Richardson, 1845, the Cape bonnetmouth, native to deep waters of the Indian and western Pacific oceans from South Africa to Australia and New Zealand.  This subspecies can reach a length of up to  TL.

The nominate subspecies is of minor importance to commercial fisheries.  Neither subspecies have yet been assessed by the IUCN.

References
 Tony Ayling & Geoffrey Cox, Collins Guide to the Sea Fishes of New Zealand,  (William Collins Publishers Ltd, Auckland, New Zealand 1982) 

Emmelichthyidae
Taxa named by John Richardson (naturalist)
Fish described in 1845